Nurken Abdirovich Abdirov (9 August 1919 – 19 December 1942) was a Kazakh pilot considered a war hero by the Soviet Union in World War II, and was killed in the Battle of Stalingrad.

Biography 
Abdirov is a legendary figure in his hometown of Karaganda, Kazakhstan. According to local history, when Abdirov's plane was disabled by enemy fire, he and gunner Aleksandr Komissarov heroically steered his descent to crash into a column of German tanks, sacrificing his own life to destroy his enemy.

On 31 March 1943, Abdirov was posthumously made Hero of the Soviet Union.

References 

1919 births
1942 deaths
Heroes of the Soviet Union
Ethnic Kazakh people
People from Karaganda
Soviet Air Force officers
Soviet military personnel killed in World War II
Soviet World War II pilots